Çamurlu, meaning "muddy" in Turkish, may refer to:

Places
 Çamurlu, Göynücek, a village in Göynücek district of Amasya Province, Turkey
 Çamurlu, Hınıs
 Çamurlu, Horasan
 Çamurlu, Hopa, a village in Hopa district of Artvin Province, Turkey
 Çamurlu, Şanlıurfa, a village in the Merkez district of Şanlıurfa Province, Turkey
 Çamurlu, Savaştepe, a village
 Ceamurlia de Jos (derived from Çamurlu), a commune in the southeast of the Tulcea County of Romania

Other uses
 Battle of Çamurlu, the battle fought in 1413 between Ottoman  prince brothers Musa Çelebi and Mehmet I 
 Çamurlu oil field, an oil field discovered 1975 in southeastern Turkey